Kharaura Halt railway station is a halt railway station on the Bakhtiyarpur–Tilaiya line under the Danapur railway division of East Central Railway zone. It is situated at Kharaura in Nalanda district in the Indian state of Bihar.

References 

Railway stations in Nalanda district
Danapur railway division